Mbongeni Buthelezi, born 1966 in Johannesburg in South Africa, is an artist who became known for "painting" in plastic.

Life 

Buthelezi attended courses at the Singaporean Institute of Art in Johannesburg from 1986 until 1992 and later also at the University of Witwatersrand from 1997 until 1998.

He was "artist in residence" several times:
Guest Artist, Wiesbaden, Germany
Kunst:Raum Sylt-Quelle, Rantum, Germany
Atelierhaus Höherweg e.V., Düsseldorf, Germany
Standard Bank National Art Festival, South Africa
Vermont Studio Centre, New York, USA
Art Omi International Artists Centre, New York USA

Work philosophy 

The material that Mbongeni Buthelezi uses for his "paintings" is always waste made of plastic: he cuts it into little pieces and glues them onto the canvas, creating surfaces and structures with subtle and changing tones and coloures. The use of such material shows Buthelezi's awareness of environmental problems and the physical decay of the townships as well as the references to general social and political impoverishment and flaw of opportunities and alternatives that he observes in South Africa.

Through his work, Buthelezi wants to mediate and communicate hope. He is convinced that seeing his works and his history, people are able to realise that in South Africa there are many opportunities, too, and that it is possible to create a better life and a career out of nothing; making art would enable people to change their lives and to contribute something positive to the world.

Buthelezi states about his style:
“I now have 18 different techniques, each of which have subtle differences from the other.  The material can be applied like large ‘brushstrokes' in many colours, or sepia toned where layers of neutral shading creates visual depth and subtlety or applied in a linear manner.”

Buthelezi's works have been exhibited internationally, including the Museum of African Art in New York, the Goch Museum in Germany as well as the Prague Biennale.

his works are part of a various collections, amongst them:
Mercedes-Benz South Africa, Pretoria, South Africa
Daimler AG, Kunstbesitz, Stuttgart, Germany
Museum for African Art, New York City
Johannesburg Art Gallery, South Africa
Spier Collection, South Africa

Exhibitions

Solo (selected) 

2011: 
Galerie Seippel Cologne, Germany
2010: 
Seippel Gallery, Arts on Main, Johannesburg, South Africa
Haus am Lützowplatz, Berlin, Germany
PAN Kunstforum Niederrhein, Emmerich, Germany
KZNSA, Durban, South Africa
Oliewenhuis Art Museum, Bloemfontein, South Africa
Red Location Museum Port Elizabeth, South Africa
William Humphreys Art Gallery, Kimberly, South Africa
2009:
Seippel Gallery, Arts on Main, Johannesburg, South Africa
Kulturverein Zehntscheuer, Rottenburg/Neckar, Germany
Pretoria Art Museum, South Africa
Sasol [Art] Museum, Stellenbosch, South Africa
2008:
Seippel Gallery Johannesburg, South Africa
2007:
Galerie Seippel Cologne, Germany
2006:
Bellevue-Saal, Wiesbaden, Germany
Art Space, Johannesburg, South Africa
2005:
SBK, Stichting Beeldende Kunst, Amsterdam, Netherlands
Galerie Seippel Cologne, Germany
Kunst:Raum Sylt Quelle, Rantum, Sylt, Germany
2004:
Museum Goch, Germany
Mural painting, Madeira, Portugal
2002:
Galerie Seippel Cologne, Germany
2001:
Atelier Haus Höherweg, Düsseldorf, Germany
Spark Gallery, Johannesburg, South Africa

Group (selected) 

2010:
ROLAND-Galerie Cologne, Germany
Galerie Seippel Cologne, Germany
2009:
FNB Johannesburg Art Fair, South Africa
2007:
Seippel Gallery Johannesburg, South Africa
2006:
10th Cairo Biennale, Egypt
Casa Encendida, Madrid, Spain
Galerie Seippel Cologne, Rhythm & Jazz
2005:
Seippel Gallery, Sydney, Australia
Biennale Prague, Czech Republic
2004:
Pretoria Art Museum, Pretoria, South Africa
Art Space, Johannesburg, South Africa
2003:
Warren Siebrits Contemporary Gallery, Johannesburg, South Africa
Deutsche Entwicklungsgesellschaft DEG, Johannesburg, South Africa
Art Fair with Galerie Seippel Cologne, Germany
Galerie Seippel Cologne, Germany
2002:
Kunst:Raum Sylt-Quelle, Rantum, Germany
Rottenburg/Neckar, Germany
2000:
Museum of Art, Houston, USA
Royal State Theater, London, UK
The Drum, Birmingham, UK
Pretoria Art Museum, South Africa
Houston Museum of Art, USA
1999:
Museum for African Art, New York City
Standard Bank Gallery, Johannesburg, South Africa
1998:
Grahamstown National Arts Festival, South Africa
1997:
Carlton Center (50 Stories Exhibition), Johannesburg, South Africa
Nondi Nisa Art Gallery, Johannesburg, South Africa
1996:
Generator Art Space, South Africa
1995:
Mofolo Art Center, Johannesburg, South Africa
Electric Workshop, Johannesburg, South Africa
Paper Prayers, Johannesburg, South Africa
Johannesburg Art Gallery, South Africa
Artist Proof Studio, Johannesburg, South Africa
1994:
Boston University, New York, South Africa
Van Rijn Gallery, Johannesburg, South Africa
Sandton Gallery, Sandton/Johannesburg, South Africa
Berman Gallery, Johannesburg, South Africa
Staib Gallery, Print Exhibition, Johannesburg, South Africa
1993:
Alliance Francaise, Johannesburg, South Africa
Funda Centre Auditorium, Soweto/Johannesburg, South Africa
Development Bank of Southern Africa, Johannesburg, South Africa
1992:
Africa Cultural Center, Johannesburg, South Africa
Market Gallery, Johannesburg, South Africa
1991:
Grahamstown National Arts Festival
1989:
Nasrec Showground, Johannesburg, South Africa
1988:
Gertrude Posel Gallery, University of Witwatersrand, Johannesburg, South Africa

Literature 

Catalogue-download at Artsourcesouthafrica
Article on Artsourcesouthafrica
Gruntkowski, Nina, und Pretoria Art Museum. Mbongeni Buthelezi, imizwa yami (my feelings). Seippel, 2009.
Chimzima, Pitso, und Susanne Madaus. Mbongeni Buthelezi. Museum Goch, 2004.

References

External links 
Artikel auf 2010sdafrika
Künstlerprofil auf der Homepage der Seippel Gallerie
Artikel auf Artsourcesouthafrica
Video: Interview mit dem Künstler
Bildergallerie
Artikel auf Basa.co.za
Bericht auf der Seite des Goch Museums
Blog-Artikel
Artikel auf fm.co.za
Artikel auf Mediaupdate
Review auf Suedafrika.org
Slideshow

Living people
South African painters
Contemporary painters
1966 births